The Maoke Plate is a small tectonic plate located in western New Guinea underlying the Sudirman Range from which the highest mountain on the island- Puncak Jaya rises. To its east is a convergent boundary with the Woodlark Plate. To the south lies a transform boundary with the Australian Plate and the Bird's Head Plate lies to the west.

References

Tectonic plates
Geology of Indonesia
Geology of the Pacific Ocean